Prince Osei Owusu (born 7 January 1997) is a German professional footballer who plays as a forward for 2. Bundesliga club Jahn Regensburg.

Career
On 25 July 2015, Owusu made his first appearance for VfB Stuttgart II in the 3. Liga against Dynamo Dresden.

In April 2018, it was announced Owusu would join 2. Bundesliga side Arminia Bielefeld for the 2018–19 season. On 26 January 2019, he was loaned out to TSV 1860 Munich for the rest of the season. On 31 August 2019, he returned to 1860 Munich for another loan spell until the end of 2019–20 season.

In January 2022 Owusu moved to 2. Bundesliga side Erzgebirge Aue until the end of the 2021–22 season. The agreement included an option for another season in case Erzgebirge Aue avoided relegation. Owusu agreed the termination of his contract with league rivals SC Paderborn.

Personal life
Born in Germany, Owusu is of Ghanaian descent.

References

External links
 

1997 births
Living people
People from Wertheim am Main
Sportspeople from Stuttgart (region)
German footballers
Ghanaian footballers
Germany youth international footballers
Association football forwards
VfB Stuttgart II players
TSG 1899 Hoffenheim II players
Arminia Bielefeld players
TSV 1860 Munich players
SC Paderborn 07 players
FC Erzgebirge Aue players
SSV Jahn Regensburg players
2. Bundesliga players
3. Liga players
Regionalliga players
German sportspeople of Ghanaian descent
Footballers from Baden-Württemberg